Noster is a Latin adjective meaning "our", and may refer to :

Geography
Knob Noster is a city in Johnson County, Missouri, United States.
Knob Noster State Park is a state park in the US state of Missouri.

Religion
Pater Noster is probably the best-known prayer in Christianity.